Aşağıtorunoba is a village in the Ovacık District, Tunceli Province, Turkey. The village is populated by Kurds of the Abasan tribe and had a population of 96 in 2021.

The hamlets of Dumantepe, Söğüt, Yapağı and Yukarıtorunoba are attached to the village.

References 

Kurdish settlements in Tunceli Province
Villages in Ovacık District